Taenerema is a genus of moths of the family Noctuidae.

Species
 Taenerema hoenei Draudt, 1950

References
Natural History Museum Lepidoptera genus database
Taenerema at funet

Hadeninae